The São Paulo Research Foundation (FAPESP) is a public foundation located in São Paulo, Brazil, with the aim of providing grants, funds and programs to support research, education and innovation of private and public institutions and companies in the state of São Paulo. It was founded in 1962 and is maintained by endowments by the State government which are guaranteed as a fixed percentage of the State's tax, besides the income generated by the financial revenues of its own assets.

FAPESP is an important institution for Brazilian science. Its investment on directed and priority projects, such as genomic science and industrial innovation, has resulted in a great international visibility for Brazilian science and technology. It has also supported the use of digital information technologies in São Paulo, such as the Academic Network of São Paulo (the academic Internet provider in the state), SciElo (a digital library), and a pioneering network of virtual research institutes.

FAPESP is active in the popularization of science. It publishes a science magazine, Pesquisa FAPESP, which has been awarded the José Reis Award for the Divulgation of Science by the National Council of Scientific and Technological Development (CNPq).

See also
 Brazilian science and technology

References

External links
FAPESP Official Website. In English.
Pesquisa FAPESP Magazine Website. In English.
Carlos Henrique de Brito Cruz: Fostering scientific development in Brazil. In English. SPIE Newsroom 6 March 2014.

Foundations based in Brazil
Research institutes in Brazil
1962 establishments in Brazil